South Carolina Highway 414 (SC 414) is a  state highway in the U.S. state of South Carolina. The highway travels through mostly rural areas of Greenville County.

Route description
SC 414 begins at an intersection with U.S. Route 276 (US 276; Geer Highway) south of Marietta, within Greenville County. It travels to the north-northeast and curves to the northeast and crosses Bull Creek. The highway curves to the east-southeast and has a very brief concurrency with US 25. SC 414 travels to the northeast and crosses over Mush and Johnson creeks. It travels through North Greenville University in Tigerville. On the southeastern edge of the university is an intersection with the northern terminus of SC 253 (Mountain View Road). SC 414 crosses over the South Tyger River. Then, it heads in a more easterly direction and crosses Tyger Cemetery. The highway enters Highland, where it has a very brief concurrency with SC 101. It curves to the east and passes Ebenezer Cemetery just before heading to the southeast. It curves back to the east just before meeting its eastern terminus, an intersection with SC 14.

Major intersections

See also

References

External links

SC 414 at Virginia Highways' South Carolina Highways Annex

414
Transportation in Greenville County, South Carolina